Adam J. Yeend is an Australian actor/producer best known for his roles in Offing David, Liz & Dick and Holding the Man, and producer of the 2014 feature film Lust for Love as well as the horror series Scary Endings. He was born in The Blue Mountains, Australia and resides in Los Angeles.

Career 

Adam J. Yeend studied acting with Lynette Sheldon and Fringe actor John Noble.
He first appeared in several short films including Boys Grammar which also featured Jai Courtney, Untitled/The Trees, and The Saviour which was nominated for the 2007 Academy Award for Best Live Action Short Film. He shortly after appeared on Australian television in guest roles on headLand and All Saints. On stage, he toured the East Coast of Australia in The Hurting Game for Brainstorm Productions as well as other Sydney-based theatre productions. In 2008 he appeared in the lead role opposite Nathaniel Buzolic in the feature film Offing David.

After moving to Los Angeles in 2009, he continued to appear in various productions including the comedic short Baby Cake opposite Claire van der Boom; the film received universal acclaim and multiple festival screenings around the world. His first US TV appearance was in Lifetime Network's Elizabeth Taylor bio pic Liz & Dick with Lindsay Lohan and Grant Bowler, as well as appearing as an 'On-camera Winner's Escort' at the 84th Academy Awards.  Expanding his facets into producing, he has worked on multiple projects including the independent romantic comedy Lust for Love which starred Dichen Lachman and Fran Kranz, Stigma, and Skypemare with Cerina Vincent, Ryan Dillon and Annika Marks; the latter two he also featured in.

In 2013 he featured opposite NFL Cornerback Nnamdi Asomugha in Double Negative and was nominated for a Best Actor Award at the World Music & Independent Film Festival for his role as an addict in Alchemy - losing out to Steven Bauer
In 2014, he has appeared in the Japanese World War II bio film An American Piano which premiered at the 2014 Cannes Film Festival, and has received strong critical praise for the starring role of John Caleo opposite Nate Jones, Cameron Daddo and Roxane Wilson for the Los Angeles production of the Australian classic, Holding the Man directed by Larry Moss. In 2015, he was nominated for Best Supporting actor in the drama category for his work in 'Holding the Man' for the 29th Annual Robby Awards in Los Angeles  and appeared in the 5th season of the  ABC drama Scandal.

Yeend is currently producing the popular horror series Scary Endings  and plays the title role opposite Jordan Ladd of the satirical thriller Brentwood Strangler which he also produced with the same production team behind Skypemare. In 2017 he featured opposite Empire actress Kaitlin Doubleday in a Scary Endings episode called "The Water Rises".

Filmography

Film

Television

Theatre

References

External links 
 

1980 births
Living people
Australian male actors
Male actors from New South Wales